Senator Tate may refer to:

Horacena Tate (born 1956), Georgia State Senate
J. Henry Tate (1830–1918), Wisconsin State Senate
Jack Tate (politician) (born 1967), Colorado State Senate
Penfield Tate III (born 1965), Colorado State Senate
Reginald Tate (politician) (1954–2019), Tennessee State Senate